Removsky is a rural locality (a settlement) and the administrative center of Removsky Selsoviet of Loktevsky District, Altai Krai, Russia. The population was 864 as of 2016. There are 9 streets.

Geography 
Removsky is located 25 km northwest of Gornyak (the district's administrative centre) by road. Novomikhaylovka is the nearest rural locality.

References 

Rural localities in Loktevsky District